Dendrobium carrii, commonly known as the furrowed moon orchid, is an epiphytic orchid in the family Orchidaceae and has well-spaced pseudobulbs with one or two leaves, and flowering stems bearing between five and ten white or cream-coloured flowers with an orange or yellow labellum. It mostly occurs on the ranges inland from Cape Tribulation and Innisfail in Queensland.

Description 
The side lobes are short and rounded and the middle lobe has three faint ridges along its midline. Flowering occurs from August to October.

Taxonomy and naming
Dendrobium carrii was first formally described in 1937 by Herman Rupp and Cyril Tenison White and the description was published in The Queensland Naturalist.
The specific epithet (carrii) refers to a Mr. Tom Carr of Julatten, who first collected it.

Distribution and habitat

References

carrii
Orchids of Queensland
Plants described in 1937
Taxa named by Cyril Tenison White
Taxa named by Herman Rupp